Dr. Elmo N. Lawrence House is a historic home located near Raleigh, Wake County, North Carolina.  It was built about 1922, and is a -story, five bay, Bungalow / American Craftsman-style dwelling built of concrete block and coated in cement stucco.  It has a side gable roof with shed dormers.  Also on the property is a contributing garage.

It was listed on the National Register of Historic Places in 2005.

References

Houses on the National Register of Historic Places in North Carolina
Houses completed in 1922
Houses in Wake County, North Carolina
National Register of Historic Places in Wake County, North Carolina